Seth Clabough (born 1975) is an American fiction writer and author of the novel All Things Await, which was nominated for the 2017 Library of Virginia Literary Award for Fiction.

Clabough was born in Richmond, Virginia in 1975, grew up on a farm in Appomattox County, Virginia, and has lived in Hawaii, Costa Rica, and the UK. Clabough's work has been published in anthologies, journals, and magazines ranging from Blackbird: an online journal of literature & the arts and Aesthetica magazine to The Chronicle of Higher Education and New Writing: the International Journal for the Practice and Theory of Creative Writing.  He has literary representation through Inkwell Management in New York and currently works at Randolph–Macon College as an English professor and Director of the Communication Center after holding similar positions at Sweet Briar College and Longwood University.

Nominations and awards
Roanoke Review - Pushcart Prize for Poetry Nomination ("Cover Letter") 2022
West Trade Review - Pushcart Prize for Fiction Nomination ("The Cabin") 2021
Ploughshares - National 'Best Short Story of the Week' selection ("Und So Weiter") 2017
Smokelong Quarterly - Editor's Selection ("Story with a Gallinule's Wing in it") 2017
Queen's Ferry Press Award - Editor Nominated 2016
Best of the Net 2016 - Editor Nominated 2016
Alternating Current - Luminaire Award for Best Prose ("It Won't Always Be Like This") 2015
storySouth - Million Writer Award: Notable Story ("To Become Immortal") 2015
Luigi Bonomi & Associates (London) - LBA Prize for Fiction (UWA)

Education
University of Wales, Aberystwyth (PhD)
University of South Carolina (MA)
Randolph-Macon College (BA)

References

Living people
1982 births
Randolph–Macon College faculty
American fiction writers
Sweet Briar College faculty
Longwood University faculty
People from Appomattox County, Virginia
Writers from Richmond, Virginia
Randolph–Macon College alumni
University of South Carolina alumni
Alumni of Aberystwyth University
Novelists from Virginia